Cabo San Antonio Lighthouse is a Cuban lighthouse located in Sandino, a municipality of Pinar del Río Province. It lies in Cape San Antonio, on Guanahacabibes Peninsula, the westernmost point of Cuba.

See also
 List of lighthouses in Cuba
 Punta Maisí Lighthouse, the easternmost in Cuba

References

External links
 Pictures of Cabo San Antonio Lighthouse

Lighthouses in Cuba
Buildings and structures in Pinar del Río Province
Lighthouse Cabo San Antonio
Lighthouses completed in 1850
19th-century architecture in Cuba